Rastakhiz Khorramshahr Football Club was a team based in Khorramshahr, Iran that competed in the Takht Jamshid Cup until the team was disbanded in 1979.

References

Defunct football clubs in Iran